Tam-Lin, also known as The Ballad of Tam-Lin, The Devil's Widow and The Devil's Woman, is a 1970 British folk horror film directed by Roddy McDowall. The film stars Ava Gardner and Ian McShane with Richard Wattis, Cyril Cusack, Stephanie Beacham, Sinéad Cusack and Joanna Lumley.

Production
The film was made by Commonwealth United Entertainment. It was produced by Alan Ladd, Jr. and Stanley Mann, from a screenplay by William Spier based on the traditional Scottish poem The Ballad of Tam Lin. The film had original music by Stanley Myers and a musical version of the original poem recorded by the British folk rock band Pentangle, and was photographed by Billy Williams. It was the only film directed by McDowall.

Filming took place in the summer of 1969 at Traquair House and other locations in Peeblesshire, Scotland. The cast stayed at the Peebles Hydro Hotel. Interiors were shot at Pinewood Studios, on sets designed by art directors John Graysmark and Donald M. Ashton. Costumes were designed by Beatrice Dawson and Ava Gardner's gowns executed by Balmain.

It's possible that pre-production work on this film prevented McDowall from reprising his role as Cornelius in Beneath the Planet of the Apes, the only one of the original five Planet of the Apes films from which he is absent. The Apes film had finished shooting by 25 June 1969, just two weeks before Tam-Lin began.

Release
Given a limited release in Britain in December 1970, the film was shelved in the United States until 1972 when the rights were acquired by American International Pictures and it was recut and renamed The Devil's Widow.

A newer release of this film (1998) (Republic Pictures Home Video) re-cut the film to be closer to Roddy McDowall's intention.

Cast
 Ava Gardner as Michaela Cazaret 
 Ian McShane as Tom Lynn 
 Richard Wattis as Elroy 
 Cyril Cusack as Vicar Julian Ainsley 
 Stephanie Beacham as Janet Ainsley 
  David Whitman (Kiffer Weisselberg) as Oliver
 Fabia Drake as Miss Gibson 
 Sinéad Cusack as Rose  
 Joanna Lumley as Georgia 
 Jenny Hanley as Caroline 
 Madeline Smith as Sue
 Bruce Robinson as Alan
 Victoria Fairbrother as Vanna

Reception
The Radio Times Guide to Film rated Tam-Lin two stars out of five. It added "although interminably slow and hilariously pretentious at times, its aura of faded Swinging Sixties decadence is interesting."

References

External links
 
 
 Podcast episode analyzing the film: https://podcasts.apple.com/us/podcast/not-just-yesterday-the-roddy-mcdowall-podcast/id1276979932?i=1000418399347
 Entry on Tam Lin Balladry website: https://tam-lin.org/transformative/movie1970.html

1970 films
1970 horror films
Folk horror films
British horror films
Films directed by Roddy McDowall
Films scored by Stanley Myers
American International Pictures films
Films shot at Pinewood Studios
Films set in London
Films set in Scotland
Films produced by Stanley Mann
1970s English-language films
1970s British films